The Lassajavre Hydroelectric Power Station ( or Lassajavrre kraftverk) is a hydroelectric power station in the municipality of Kvænangen in Troms county, Norway. The plant utilizes a drop between Lake Abo and Lake Lassa. The Lassajavre plant also utilizes water from Lake Mollis and Lake Sarves. The plant came into operation in 1977. The plant is controlled by Kvænangen Kraftverk AS, with a 48.2% share owned by Troms Kraft.

See also

References

Hydroelectric power stations in Norway
Troms
Energy infrastructure completed in 1977
Dams in Norway